Greilada elegans is a species of sea slug, a nudibranch, a shell-less marine gastropod mollusc in the family Polyceridae.

Distribution 
This species occurs from southern England and Wales, south along coasts of the Atlantic to the Mediterranean Sea. It is found in the Canary Islands and as far east as Italy in the Mediterranean Sea.

Description
This polycerid nudibranch is translucent orange with large iridescent blue spots. There is a tracery of blue-green iridescence along the pallial margin and on the midribs of the gills.

References

External links
 

Polyceridae
Gastropods described in 1894